Reviews of Modern Physics (abbreviated RMP) is a quarterly peer-reviewed scientific journal published by the American Physical Society. It was established in 1929 and the current editor-in-chief is Michael Thoennessen. The journal publishes review articles, usually by established researchers, on all aspects of physics and related fields. The reviews are usually accessible to non-specialists and serve as introductory material to graduate students, which survey recent work, discuss key problems to be solved and provide perspectives toward the end.

References

External links 
 

Publications established in 1929
Physics review journals
Quarterly journals
English-language journals
American Physical Society academic journals